A Guarda is a municipality in the province of Pontevedra in the autonomous community of Galicia, in Spain. It is situated in the comarca of O Baixo Miño.

Demography 
From:INE Archiv

Politics

Sister cities 
 Santo Domingo, Dominican Republic (2005)
 Póvoa de Varzim, Portugal [2022]

Notable Natives 
Julia Vaquero

References

External links
Awarded "EDEN - European Destinations of Excellence" non traditional tourist destination 2010

Municipalities in the Province of Pontevedra